Saint-Avertin is a commune in the Indre-et-Loire department in central France.

History

In the Gallo-Roman times, a hamlet called Vinciacum was set up near quarries where stones required for the building of Caesarodonum (Tours) were extracted. The village took later the name of Vençay. In 1162, St. Thomas Beckett, Archbishop of Canterbury, took part to a council in Tours with a Scottish monk named Aberdeen (c. 1120-1180). Becket was murdered in the cathedral of Canterbury upon King Henry II's request in 1170. Aberdeen decided to come back to Touraine and lived as an hermit in the wood of Cangé. The hermit, locally known as Avertin, became famous for his healing skills, especially against headache. The inhabitants of Vençay asked him to be their parish priest, which he accepted. After his death, he was buried in the parish church, which became a place of pilgrimage. Vençay was renamed Saint-Avertin in 1371.

Jean de Coningham (? - 1495), Captain of the Scottish Guard of King Louis XI, purchased in 1489 the castle of Cangé, and transformed the old medieval fortress into a more pleasant castle. Louis XI (1423–1483; King in 1461) enjoyed Touraine and stayed often in his castle of Plessis (today in Plessis-lès-Tours), where he ended his life in a very shanty atmosphere; the King believed he had leprosy, was scared by imaginary plots and superstition, and was surrounded by a court dominated by astrologers and charlatans of that ilk. The Coninghams owned the castle of Cangé until 1679.

The book-binder and typograph Christophe Plantin (1514–1589) was born in Saint-Avertin. He learned binding in Paris and typography in Caen. He settled in 1549 in Antwerp as a leather worker. In 1555, he broke his shoulder and had to change job; he opened a printing house, where he operated up to 22 presses. Plantin was accused in 1562 of having printed a heretical book and had to leave Antwerp for a few months. The humanist Justus Lipsus called him in Leyden in 1583, but he quickly came back to Antwerp, where he died and was buried in the Notre-Dame cathedral. Plantin printed more than 1,500 books. His masterpiece is the polyglot Bible ordered by King of Spain Philip II. It took five years (1568–1572) to Plantin to produce the eight volumes of the Bible, edited by the Spanish humanist Arias Montanus. Plantin was conferred the title of Architypograph of the King and the monopoly on the release of certain liturgical books in Spain and in the Spanish colonies. Among the other Plantin's works are Ortelius' atlases, Dodoens' botanical treaties, musical scores, Guicciardini's description of the Low Countries and Lipsus' treaties. Plantin's trademark was the Golden Compass and his motto was Labore et constantia.

The writer Jules Romains (Louis Farigoule, 1885–1972) purchased in 1929 the Grand'Cour estate in Saint-Avertin. He wrote there parts of his master series, Les hommes de bonnes volonté, in which he expressed his "unanimist" ideas.

In June 1940, following the German invasion of France, the government of the Third Republic withdrew to Tours. President Albert Lebrun spent five days in the castle of Cangé, where he presided two Councils of the Ministers on 12 and 13 June.

Population

See also
Communes of the Indre-et-Loire department

References

Communes of Indre-et-Loire